Chief Constable of the North Wales Police v Evans [1982] UKHL 10 is a UK constitutional law case, concerning judicial review.

Facts
Evans claimed he was unjustly dismissed as a probationary constable. He received good progress reports. The Chief Constable interviewed him and asked him to resign rather than formally firing him on the grounds that Evans (1) married a woman much older than himself, the former mistress of his uncle, which ostensibly might have been a scandal for the force, (2) he was keeping four dogs in a police council house, which had a one dog limit, and (3) Evans and his wife lived a “hippy” lifestyle. Evans argued that if he had been able to choose between his dogs and his career, the dogs would have gone.

Judgment
The House of Lords held the Chief Officer’s discretion under the Police Regulations 1971 was not absolute, but qualified and could only be exercised if the probationer was unfit for office or unlikely to become an efficient constable, in accordance with natural justice. The supposedly adverse factors were never put to Evans. However, an order for mandamus for reinstatement would usurp the Chief Constable’s powers, so declaring the action void was unsatisfactory. Instead, Evans would have a declaration affirming an unlawfully induced resignation and could get damages.

Lord Brightman said the following.

Lord Hailsham LC, Lord Fraser, Lord Roskill, Lord Bridge gave concurring opinions.

See also

UK constitutional law
UK labour law

Notes

References

United Kingdom constitutional case law